The fawn-coloured lark (Calendulauda africanoides) or fawn-coloured bush-lark is a species of lark in the family Alaudidae. It is found in south-central Africa.

Taxonomy and systematics
Formerly, the fawn-coloured lark was classified as belonging to the genus Mirafra until moved to Calendulauda in 2009. Not all authorities recognize this re-classification.

Subspecies 
Six subspecies are recognized:
 C. a. trapnelli - (White, CMN, 1943): Found in south-eastern Angola and south-western Zambia
 Damaraland fawn-coloured lark or Naivasha fawn-coloured lark (C. a. harei) - (Roberts, 1917): Found from central Namibia to south-western Botswana and north-western South Africa.
 C. a. makarikari - (Roberts, 1932): Found from south-western Angola and northern Namibia to western Zambia and northern and central Botswana
 C. a. sarwensis - (Roberts, 1932): Found in western Botswana, eastern Namibia and north-central South Africa
 C. a. vincenti - (Roberts, 1938): Found in central Zimbabwe and southern Mozambique
 C. a. africanoides - (Smith, 1836): Found in southern Namibia, southern and eastern Botswana, south-western Zimbabwe and northern South Africa

Distribution and habitat 
The range of Mirafra africanoides is broadly spread, with an estimated global extent of occurrence of 2,400,000 km2. It can be found in the countries of Angola, Botswana, Ethiopia, Kenya, Mozambique, Namibia, Somalia, South Africa, Tanzania, Uganda, Zambia, and Zimbabwe.

References

External links 

Species factsheet - BirdLife International
Species text - The Atlas of Southern African Birds

fawn-coloured lark
Birds of Southern Africa
fawn-coloured lark
fawn-coloured lark
Taxonomy articles created by Polbot